María Luisa Arencibia (born September 3, 1959) is a Venezuelan composer, organist, and teacher.

Biography 
Born in Canarias, Arencibia studied at the Escuela de Música Juan Manuel Olivares and Escuela Superior de Música José Ángel Lamas graduating as a composer in 1990. Her instructors also included José Luis Arreaza, José Peñín and Humberto Sagredo. She has served as maestra de capilla at the El Valle church, and has taught music at various schools around Caracas. Her musical output includes a number of chamber compositions as well as works for orchestra and choir.

References

1959 births
Living people
Venezuelan classical composers
Venezuelan women classical composers
20th-century classical composers
21st-century classical composers
Venezuelan organists
Women organists
20th-century organists
21st-century organists
20th-century women composers
21st-century women composers